The Volunteer Cross for War and the Volunteer Medal for War (Krzyż i Medal Ochotniczy za Wojnę) were Polish military decorations introduced just before the start of World War II and later awarded by the Polish government in exile.
The Cross and the Volunteer Medal for War were introduced by an act of the Sejm on 15 June 1939. It was to be awarded to people who volunteered for duty in the years 1918 to 1921 and helped to strengthen the independence of the Polish Republic. (Covering mainly the Polish-Ukrainian War and Polish-Soviet war).
Because of the German invasion of Poland in 1939 and the outbreak of World War II no decorations were awarded at the time. It was only after 1945 that the Polish government in exile was able to award the decorations. The communists authorities of the People's Republic of Poland refused to recognize the decoration. After the fall of communism a very similar decoration, Krzyż za udział w Wojnie 1918-1921, was introduced.

Orders, decorations, and medals of Poland